R-Line or R Line may refer to:
 R-Line (Capital Area Transit), a zero-fare circulator bus service in Raleigh, North Carolina
 R-Line (Norfolk Southern), a secondary main railway line running between Charlotte, North Carolina, and Augusta, Georgia
 R-Line (RIPTA), a Rapid Bus service in Rhode Island
 R Line (RTD), a light rail line in Aurora, Denver, Greenwood Village, Centennial and Lone Tree, Colorado
 R (New York City Subway service)
 R (Los Angeles Railway), a former streetcar service in Los Angeles, California
 VW R-Line, a Volkswagen sport or high performance model